Beaufortia cyclica is a species of ray-finned fish in the genus Beaufortia.

Footnotes 

 

Beaufortia (fish)
Fish described in 1980